Yevgeni Aleksandrovich Steshin (born 14 April 1992) is a Russian professional football player. He plays for FC Shinnik Yaroslavl in Russian First League.

Club career
He made his Russian Football National League debut for FC Shinnik Yaroslavl on 4 April 2012 in a game against FC Mordovia Saransk.

References

External links
 

1992 births
Footballers from Yaroslavl
Living people
Russian footballers
Association football defenders
FC Shinnik Yaroslavl players
FC Volgar Astrakhan players
FC Luch Vladivostok players
Russian First League players
Russian Second League players